The 2019 Styrian state election was held on 24 November 2019 to elect the members of the Landtag of Styria.

The conservative Austrian People's Party (ÖVP) was the clear winner of the election, winning 36.0% on a swing of 7.6 percentage points. This came to the detriment of the former largest party, the centre-left Social Democratic Party of Austria (SPÖ), which lost six points and fell to second place. The Freedom Party of Austria (FPÖ) fell by nine points. The Greens made a strong showing, winning 12% and doubling their representation to six seats. The Communist Party of Austria (KPÖ) achieved their best result since re-entering the Landtag in 2005 with 6.0%. NEOS – The New Austria (NEOS) doubled its voteshare from the 2015 election, winning 5.4%, and entered the Landtag with two seats.

The outgoing government, a coalition of the SPÖ and ÖVP, was unusual in that it was headed by a member of the smaller party – Hermann Schützenhöfer of the ÖVP. With his party's success in the election, he was re-elected Governor by the Landtag at the head of a renewed ÖVP–SPÖ coalition.

Background
In the 2015 election, the SPÖ–ÖVP government suffered major losses (–9.0 and –8.7 points respectively) to the FPÖ (+16.1 points), with all three parties finishing within a 2.5 percentage point margin of one another. Afterwards, in line with a promise to step down if the SPÖ fell below 30% of votes, Governor Franz Voves announced his resignation. With the SPÖ and ÖVP planning to continue their coalition, the larger SPÖ was expected to retain the governorship. However, after several days of negotiations, the government announced that Voves would be succeeded by ÖVP leader Hermann Schützenhöfer. This was received poorly by opposition parties and the federal SPÖ alike, who criticised it as a breach of political convention. The Styrian SPÖ claimed it had been done to prevent the ÖVP from defecting and forming a coalition with the FPÖ.

In May 2019, the Ibiza affair led to the collapse of the federal government between the ÖVP and FPÖ. The September 2019 federal election took place two months ahead of the Styrian election and saw substantial losses for the FPÖ and SPÖ, and gains for the ÖVP and Greens.

Electoral system
The 48 seats of the Landtag of Styria are elected via open list proportional representation in a two-step process. 40 of the seats are distributed between four multi-member constituencies. For parties to receive any representation in the Landtag, they must win at least one seat in a constituency directly. Seats are distributed in constituencies according to the Hare quota, with eight leveling seats allocated using the D'Hondt method at the state level, to ensure overall proportionality between a party's vote share and its share of seats.

Contesting parties

Opinion polling

Results

Results by constituency

References

External links

Styria
State elections in Austria
2019 in Austria